Unith, previously Crowd Mobile and Crowd Media, is an Australian and European-based artificial intelligence business, focusing on media technology around conversational commerce and its Talking Head platform for mobile and smart device applications. Unith’s Talking Head platform combines AI with machine-learning based technology to generate digital avatars that appear visually as unique individuals. 

The company is publicly listed on the Australian Securities Exchange and Frankfurt Stock Exchange. 

Domenic Carosa launched the company in 2009 with a mobile app that focused on providing crowd sourced expert answers to customer questions.

Crowd Mobile was listed on the Australian Securities Exchange in 2015 and raised AU$3.8 million in pre-IPO funding in the same year.

Service 
Unith’s artificial intelligence (AI) leverages its data bank which has been accumulating data on human-to-human conversations since 2009. These human interactions provide the underlying data that delivers Unith’s conversational AI services which enable computer-to-human conversations in real time. Audio elements of the platform are generated from voice cloning or synthetic audio to provide corresponding sound that accompanies the visual elements. Digital avatars are then powered by conversational AI for them to provide humanized interactions in real time across multiple languages. 

Unith’s conversational AI is a B2B service where Unith delivers conversational AI capabilities to its clients, enabling them to automate customer service, marketing, sales, and education with interactive capability that corresponds with audio and visual elements.

Unith’s artificial intelligence platform is further supported by its partners that specialise in different elements of media technology, including a 10% equity stake in Aflorithmic Labs, a Spain-based synthetic audio company, and partnership with media search company SrcFlare.

History 
Domenic Carosa founded Crowd Mobile in 2009 after leaving his previous role with the Destra Corporation. The mobile app was created so users could pay to ask experts to answer their questions, with each question billed at a set amount. In 2014, the company's financials showed that Crowd Mobile had processed more than 3.4 million questions. The total questions generated AU$9.8 million in revenue, which gave the company a gross income of AU$2.2 million for the financial year.

According to an article in ZDNet, the company had expanded to operate in 13 countries by 2015. During the same year, Q Limited acquired the Australian company in a reverse-takeover. Shortly after the takeover, the company raised AU$3.8 million in pre-IPO funding prior to its IPO listing. It was reported that Artesian Venture Partners' crowdfunding platform VentureCrowd was responsible for AU$363,000 of the pre-IPO funding.

During the same year, plans were announced for Crowd Mobile to diversify into the micro job market. Following the IPO their 2015 market capitalisation was set at AU$15 million, after originally being listed at 20c a share.

Crowd Mobile announced shortly after the IPO that it would be acquiring the Dutch firm, Track Holdings, for a reported AU$35 million. Additional funding was also raised during the same year, with AU$2 million raised from a round of funding. Any Questions Answered (AQA Mobile) was also acquired for $165,000.

In March 2016, Crowd Mobile announced a partnership deal with Newzulu. The partnership service will allow citizen journalists, photographers and videographers to submit news content via an app that has been developed in partnership with Newzulu.

In December 2018, Crowd Mobile changed its name to Crowd Media while retaining its corporate structure as a public listed company. 

In August 2019, Crowd Media secured a AU $3.7 million investment from a European Consortium led by South African businessman Steven Schapera, a co-founder of BECCA Cosmetics. After expanding BECCA to more than 35 countries around the world, he exited when the business was sold to Estee Lauder for a reported US $200 million. Following the investment in Crowd Media, Schapera was appointed Chairman of the company.

In January 2021, Domenic Carosa resigned from his role as CEO of Crowd Media to concentrate on other blockchain-related ventures which included Banxa, a cryptocurrency on-boarding platform that he co-founded and held the role of Chairman. Other blockchain businesses with links to Carosa include Earnity, Apollo Capital, Blockmate Ventures, Hivello and Midpoint. 

During Schapera’s tenure, Crowd Media underwent a transformational change to leverage its database of human-to-human conversations into artificial intelligence capable of engaging in human-to-computer conversations. This transformation was announced by Schapera following his appointment as Chairman as a 3-year-plan that would culminate in commercialisation of the new conversational AI platform by 2022. 

In September 2021, Crowd Media confirmed the appointment of Idan Schmorak as CEO. This was followed by the Company announcing its first revenue-generating client for its conversational AI platform when contracted by South African healthcare company PangeaMed for a telehealth solution to assist medical professionals address patient queries using artificial intelligence. 

In October 2022, Crowd Media confirmed that it has been engaged by one of the Big Five tech company to supply three digital avatars licences for the purpose of information delivery, where each will be able to interact with real people and be powered entirely by artificial intelligence. The avatars will be able to converse in multiple languages which can potentially save the client hiring multiple employees to cover different regions. 

In December 2022, Crowd Media changed its name to Unith (ASX: UNT) while retaining its corporate structure as a publicly listed company.

References

Companies listed on the Australian Securities Exchange